Shoshone County is a county in the U.S. state of Idaho. As of the 2020 census, the population was 13,169. The largest city is Kellogg. The county was established in 1864, named for the Native American Shoshone tribe.

Shoshone County is commonly referred to as the Silver Valley, due to its century-old mining history. The Silver Valley is famous nationwide for the vast amounts of silver, lead, and zinc mined from it.

History

Shoshone County was formed under the Territory of Washington on January 9, 1861.  Washington Territory legislators established the county in anticipation of the gold rush that occurred after the discovery of gold at Pierce in October, 1860. Their location of the northern boundary at a line drawn due east from the mouth of the Clearwater River, unknowingly placed the emerging mining settlement at Pierce outside of the county's boundaries while residents of the new Mormon settlement at Franklin were unknowingly within the established boundaries. Regardless of the geographic reality,  the county seat was at Pierce. Growth at Pierce was so rapid that Shoshone County boasted the largest vote of any county within Washington Territory at the territorial election of July 8, 1861. In less than a year, Shoshone County contained additional settlements at Lewiston, Elk City, Newsome, and Florence. On December 20, 1861, Nez Perce and Idaho counties were created from most of the original territory of Shoshone County. On the following day, Shoshone's boundaries were shifted northward, containing most of present-day Clearwater County and a portion of present-day Shoshone County.

This new boundary alignment left the existing settlement at Pierce and the new settlement of Orofino as the county's only settlements. The county's population dwindled as prospectors abandoned Pierce for gold prospects at Elk City and Florence. Idaho Territory was created in 1863 and the first census of the territory in that year enumerated only 574 residents in Shoshone County. The county boundaries were expanded to include the Silver Valley by the legislative assembly of Idaho Territory when it officially created Shoshone County on February 4, 1864. The expanded territory contained no population at the second census of Idaho Territory in 1864. All of the county's 276 residents were located at Pierce and Orofino.

Until 1904, Shoshone County included present-day Clearwater County to the south. That portion was annexed by Nez Perce County for several years and then was established as a new county in 1911. When the Silver Valley population rose dramatically in the 1880s, the seat was moved to Murray in 1884 (and to Wallace in 1898) to better serve the majority of the county's population. The southern area's population increased with homesteading in the Weippe area in the late 1890s. The vast distance and time required for travel to Wallace from the Clearwater River area prompted the southern portion to move to Nez Perce County.
        
Hard rock miners in Shoshone County protested wage cuts with a strike in 1892. After several died in a shooting war provoked by discovery of a company spy, the U.S. army forced an end to the strike. Hostilities erupted once again in 1899 when, in response to the company firing seventeen men for joining the union, the miners dynamited the Bunker Hill & Sullivan mill. Again, people died, and the U.S. Army intervened, requested by Governor Frank Steunenberg, as the Idaho National Guard troops were still stationed in the Philippines following the Spanish–American War. Steunenberg was assassinated outside his residence in Caldwell in 1905, nearly five years after leaving office, and the subsequent trials in Boise in 1907 made national headlines.

Much of the county was burned in the Great Fire of 1910, including part of the town of Wallace.

Geography

Adjacent counties
 Bonner County - north
 Sanders County, Montana - northeast/Mountain Time Border
 Mineral County, Montana - southeast/Mountain Time Border
 Clearwater County - south
 Latah County - southwest
 Benewah County - west
 Kootenai County - northwest

Major highways

National protected areas
 Clearwater National Forest (part)
 Coeur d'Alene National Forest (part)
 St. Joe National Forest (part)

Demographics

2000 census
As of the census of 2000, there were 13,771 people, 5,906 households, and 3,856 families living in the county.  The population density was 5 people per square mile (2/km2).  There were 7,057 housing units at an average density of 3 per square mile (1/km2).  The racial makeup of the county was 95.84% White, 0.11% Black or African American, 1.52% Native American, 0.23% Asian, 0.07% Pacific Islander, 0.49% from other races, and 1.74% from two or more races.  1.93% of the population were Hispanic or Latino of any race. 22.1% were of German, 14.0% American, 11.3% English, 9.7% Irish and 5.9% Norwegian ancestry.

There were 5,906 households, out of which 26.70% had children under the age of 18 living with them, 52.70% were married couples living together, 8.10% had a female householder with no husband present, and 34.70% were non-families. 29.40% of all households were made up of individuals, and 13.60% had someone living alone who was 65 years of age or older.  The average household size was 2.30 and the average family size was 2.82.

In the county, the population was spread out, with 22.90% under the age of 18, 6.70% from 18 to 24, 25.50% from 25 to 44, 27.40% from 45 to 64, and 17.40% who were 65 years of age or older.  The median age was 42 years. For every 100 females there were 99.40 males.  For every 100 females age 18 and over, there were 97.00 males.

The median income for a household in the county was $28,535, and the median income for a family was $35,694. Males had a median income of $30,439 versus $18,831 for females. The per capita income for the county was $15,934.  About 12.40% of families and 16.40% of the population were below the poverty line, including 21.80% of those under age 18 and 10.00% of those age 65 or over.

2010 census
As of the 2010 United States Census, there were 12,765 people, 5,605 households, and 3,511 families living in the county. The racial makeup of the county was 95.4% white, 1.4% American Indian, 0.4% Asian, 0.2% black or African American, 0.1% Pacific islander, 0.5% from other races, and 2.0% from two or more races. Those of Hispanic or Latino origin made up 3.0% of the population. In terms of ancestry, 32.2% were German, 17.6% were Irish, 13.5% were English, 6.4% were Norwegian, and 4.4% were American.

Of the 5,605 households, 25.4% had children under the age of 18 living with them, 48.5% were married couples living together, 8.7% had a female householder with no husband present, 37.4% were non-families, and 31.3% of all households were made up of individuals. The average household size was 2.25 and the average family size was 2.79. The median age was 46.2 years.

The median income for a household in the county was $36,654 and the median income for a family was $44,685. Males had a median income of $38,315 versus $25,273 for females. The per capita income for the county was $19,020. About 13.8% of families and 17.9% of the population were below the poverty line, including 22.5% of those under age 18 and 8.3% of those age 65 or over.

Politics
Shoshone County was historically a Democratic-leaning county, but in recent years has voted for Republican presidential candidates, while favoring Democratic candidates locally and statewide. The county polled a majority for Democratic Gubernatorial candidate Jerry Brady and Democratic Senatorial candidate Larry LaRocco, but Barack Obama lost in 2008 by an eight-point margin.

Communities

Cities

Kellogg
Mullan
Osburn
Pinehurst
Smelterville
Wallace
Wardner

Census-designated place 

 Silverton

Unincorporated communities

Adair
Avery
Big Creek
Calder
Cataldo
Clarkia
Enaville
Gold Creek
Hoyt
Kingston
Murray
Prichard

Ghost town
Burke

Ski areas
Silver Mountain
Lookout Pass

See also

National Register of Historic Places listings in Shoshone County, Idaho
Coeur d'Alene, Idaho labor confrontation of 1899

Notes

References

Further reading
 John M. Henderson and William S. Shiach, with Harry B. Averill, An Illustrated History of North Idaho: Embracing Nez Perces, Idaho, Latah, Kootenai and Shoshone Counties, State of Idaho. n.c. [Chicago]: Western Historical Publishing Co., 1903.

External links

County Parcel Map
State of Idaho: Shoshone County

 
Idaho counties
Idaho placenames of Native American origin
1864 establishments in Idaho Territory
Populated places established in 1864